Oehler is a surname. Notable people with the surname include:

Hans Oehler (1888–1967), Swiss journalist
Hugo Oehler (1903–1983), American communist
Mike Oehler (1938–2016), American author
Richard Oehler (1878–1948), German Nietzsche scholar

See also
 Oehlers, surname
 Oehler system
 Ohler, surname